Peter Ross Newman is an American film producer and educator. He attended Northwestern University and began his producing career in the 1980s.

Newman has been married to casting director and filmmaker Antonia Dauphin since 1988, and is the father of actors Griffin Newman and James Newman. , he is an associate professor at New York University, teaching courses at both the Tisch School of the Arts and the Stern School of Business; in 2008, he was named the first head of a dual MFA-MBA program, which the university describes as the first of its kind in the United States. 

, Newman lives between Greenwich Village, Manhattan, and a vacation home on Blackberry Farm, in the Great Smoky Mountains.

Selected filmography 

O.C. and Stiggs (1987)
Swimming to Cambodia (1987)
Lord of the Flies (1990)
 Dogfight (1991)
 The Secret of Roan Inish (1994)
 Blue in the Face (1995)
 Smoke (1995)
 Space Truckers (1996)
 The Hairy Bird (1998)
 Interstate 60: Episodes of the Road (2002)
 The Squid and the Whale (2005)
The Game of Their Lives (2005)
The Music Never Stopped (2011)

References

External links 

Year of birth missing (living people)
20th-century American businesspeople
21st-century American businesspeople
American film producers
Businesspeople from New York City
Film producers from New York (state)
Living people
New York University Stern School of Business faculty
Northwestern University School of Communication alumni
People from Greenwich Village
Tisch School of the Arts faculty